Ectoedemia rosiphila is a moth of the family Nepticulidae. It was described by Rimantas Puplesis in 1990. It is known from Kazakhstan and Tadzhikistan.

The larvae feed on Rosa fedtschenkoana. They mine the leaves of their host plant.

References

Nepticulidae
Moths described in 1992
Moths of Asia